Andrew T. Hsu (born 1956) is an American educator and the twenty-third  president of the College of Charleston. He began his presidency on May 17, 2019. He is the first person of color to serve as president in the college's 252-year history.

Education
Born in 1956, in Beijing, China, Hsu attended Tsinghua University in Beijing before earning master's and doctoral degrees in aerospace engineering from Georgia Institute of Technology in 1982 and 1986, respectively.

Career
Hsu worked for Sverdrup Technology and Rolls-Royce before joining the University of Miami as an associate professor and director of aerospace engineering in 1997. Hsu was the founding director of the Richard G. Lugar Center for Renewable Energy at IUPUI (2007-2010). He served as dean of engineering at San Jose State University (2013-2016) and provost and executive vice president for academic affairs at the University of Toledo (2016-2019) before becoming the 23rd president of the College of Charleston in 2019.

References 

1956 births
Living people
People from Beijing
Presidents of the College of Charleston
Tsinghua University alumni
Georgia Tech alumni
University of Miami faculty
San Jose State University faculty
American people of Chinese descent
Chinese American
Chinese emigrants to the United States